Eric Desmond Jack (born April 19, 1972) is a former American football cornerback who played in the National Football League for one season. He played college football at New Mexico.

Professional career
Jack signed with the Atlanta Falcons as an undrafted free agent following the 1994 NFL Draft. He saw action in all 16 games, making 10 tackles and returning one fumble for a touchdown. 

On July 22, 1995, Jack was placed on injured reserve. Jack was eventually released by the Falcons, and did not appear in a game during the 1995 season.

NFL statistics

Regular season

References

External links
 Pro Football Archives bio

1972 births
Living people
Players of American football from Dallas
American football cornerbacks
New Mexico Lobos football players
Atlanta Falcons players
People from Dallas